M'hamed Benredouane (20 August 1950 – 3 August 2020) was an Algerian politician.

Benredouane worked as a lecturer at Mustapha Pacha hospital in Algiers and was host of the TV program "Avis religieux" on Canal Algérie.

He served as Minister of Religious Affairs under the rule of Sid Ahmed Ghozali from 1991 to 1992. He was a member and once served as Vice-President of the Foundation Emir Abdelkader.

References

1950 births
2020 deaths
20th-century Algerian politicians
21st-century Algerian politicians
People from Blida Province